Cloverleaf or clover leaf may refer to:

Plant

The leaf of the clover plant, or its shape

Companies
Clover Leaf Seafoods, Markham, Ontario-based marketer of seafood products

Places
Cloverleaf, Louisville, Kentucky, a neighborhood
Cloverleaf, Texas, a suburb of Houston
Cloverleaf Local School District in southern Medina County, Ohio

Science and technology
A representation of the chemical structure of a transfer RNA molecule
The IEC 60320 C5, and C6 electrical power connectors, sometimes colloquially called cloverleaf connections
Cloverleaf quasar, a rare example of a quadruply-lensed quasar
Command key in apple computer, '⌘', colloquially known as the "cloverleaf" key
 The 4-round capacity model of the Colt House Revolver, a 19th-century handgun.

Transport
A symbol for Alfa Romeo (vehicles)- see Alfa Romeo#The Quadrifoglio logo
Cloverleaf interchange, a highway interchange
Toledo, St. Louis and Western Railroad, commonly called the Clover Leaf

Other uses
71st Infantry Division (Wehrmacht), nicknamed the Cloverleaf Division
Clover Leaf (Fabergé egg)
Cloverleaf, a submission hold in pro wrestling

See also
Four-leaf clover, a mutation